Mickey and Minnie Wish Upon a Christmas is a musical Christmas television special that premiered on December 2, 2021 on Disney Junior at 7:00 pm.

It is the second spinoff special of Mickey Mouse Mixed-Up Adventures, though it isn't officially part of the series.

Plot
Mickey and his pals usually celebrate at the same location at Hot Dog Hills every Christmas. However, when the locations get mixed up, it's a wild ride filled with hilarity and doubts as our lovable band of friends race against time throughout multiple countries to get home in time for Christmas.

Cast
 Bret Iwan as Mickey Mouse
 Bill Farmer as Goofy
 Daniel Ross as Donald Duck
 Tress MacNeille as Daisy Duck
 Kaitlyn Robrock as Minnie Mouse, Jenny
 Jim Cummings as Pete
 Brock Powell as Santa Claus, Henry
 Nika Futterman as Cuckoo Loca
 April Winchell as Clarabelle Cow

Note: Clarabelle Cow is credited even though she doesn't appear in the special.

Songs
"The Merriest is Yet To Come" – sung by Minnie & the gang
"The Perfect Gift" – sung by Mickey & the gang
"Christmas Is" – sung by Minnie
"Wish Upon a Christmas" – performed by Beau Black
"What Makes Christmas Christmas" – sung by Mickey & the gang

Reception

Critical response 
Ben Breitbart of LaughingPlace.com called Mickey and Minnie Wish Upon a Christmas a "strong holiday special," writing, "The holidays are a time for nostalgia and unadulterated glee. Mickey and Minnie Wish Upon a Christmas may be the Disney equivalent of a Hallmark movie, but that is exactly what the doctor ordered. Spending time with familiar friends in a familiar set-up is perfect to bring a smile to your face. Whether you are enjoying with your family, or just reliving your own fond memories, I fully recommend checking the special out to get your holidays off on the right foot." Sydni Ellis of People included the film in their "Best Christmas Movies to Stream on Disney+ in 2022" list. Stephanie Snyde of Common Sense Media gave Mickey and Minnie Wish Upon a Christmas a grade of 3 out of 5 stars, complimented the depiction of positives messages and role models, citing the importance of friends and family demonstrated across the characters, while praising the songs and the humor of the special.

Ratings 
On its premiere airing on Disney Junior at 7:00 p.m., the special was watched by 0.38 million viewers. The special was broadcast again the next day on Disney Channel at 9:30 a.m. and was watched by 0.26 million viewers.

Accolades

References

External links
 
 

2020s American television specials
2020s animated television specials
2021 television specials
2021 in American television
Christmas television specials
Disney television specials
Disney Junior television specials
Mickey Mouse
Santa Claus in television
Television specials by Disney Television Animation
2021 animated films
Children's and Family Emmy Award winners